Aaron Christopher Cervantes (born March 20, 2002) is an American soccer player who plays as a goalkeeper for Scottish Premiership side Rangers. Cervantes previously played for Orange County SC of the USL Championship.

Professional career

Orange County SC 
Cervantes signed his first professional deal with Orange County SC on March 15, 2018, at the age of 15.  He was the youngest ever player to sign a professional deal with the club. Cervantes did not make any appearances in his first season with the club. In his second season with the club, Cervantes broke into Orange County's first team, making 11 league appearances and 1 further appearance in the U.S. Open Cup. His professional debut came against New Mexico United on March 23, 2019. In between his second and third seasons with the club, Orange County and Rangers F.C. signed a partnership agreement that would result in the movement of players, due to this partnership Cervantes trained with the Glasgow side in December 2019. In his third season with the club, Cervantes made 6 appearances in a season that was cut short due to the COVID-19 pandemic. In October 2020 it was announced that Cervantes would leave Orange County for Scottish club Rangers for a deal that could rise to the high six figures.

Rangers 
On October 7, 2020, it was announced that Cervantes would move to Rangers of the Scottish Premiership. It was noted that due to the surrounding issues of COVID-19 that Cervantes would train with Orange County through December and then Rangers would loan him to another European team for the latter half of the 2020–21 season.

On January 22, 2022, Cervantes joined Scottish Championship side Partick Thistle on a seven-day emergency loan deal.

Career statistics 
As of October 7, 2020

References

2002 births
Living people
People from Chino Hills, California
Sportspeople from San Bernardino County, California
Soccer players from California
American soccer players
Association football goalkeepers
Orange County SC players
Rangers F.C. players
Partick Thistle F.C. players
USL Championship players
American expatriate soccer players
Expatriate footballers in Scotland
American expatriate sportspeople in Scotland